Francis Robartes FRS (c. 1649 – 3 February 1718) was an English politician who sat in the House of Commons at various times between 1673 and 1718.

Early life
Robartes was the fourth son of John Robartes, 1st Earl of Radnor and his second wife Letitia Isabella Smythe (1630–1714). He was baptised at Lanhydrock in Cornwall on 6 January 1650. He was at school at Chelsea under Mr Cary and was admitted at Christ's College, Cambridge on 2 May 1663 aged 13. Robartes was known as a musical composer and a writer of the theory of sound. He became a Fellow of the Royal Society in 1673.

Political career
In 1673, Robartes was elected Member of Parliament for  Bossiney in the Cavalier Parliament and sat until 1679. He was elected MP for Cornwall in 1679 and sat until 1681. He was elected for Cornwall again in 1685 and sat until 1687. In 1689 he was elected MP for Lostwithiel and sat until 1690 when he was re-elected for Cornwall. He was elected MP for Tregony in 1695 and sat until 1702 when he was elected MP for Bodmin. He sat for Bodmin until 1708, for Lostwithiel again from 1709 to 1710 and for Bodmin from 1710 to 1718. He was a Teller of the Exchequer from 1704 to 1710.

Later life
Robartes became a vice-president of the Royal Society. He was the brother of Robert Robartes and Hender Robartes. Robartes married firstly Penelope Pole, daughter of Sir Courtenay Pole, 2nd Baronet and Urith Shapcote, but had no issue. He married secondly Lady Anne Fitzgerald, daughter of Wentworth Fitzgerald, 17th Earl of Kildare and Lady Elizabeth Holles, and widow of Hugh Boscawen of Tregothnan, and their son, John, inherited the title of 4th Earl of Radnor.

Robartes died at Chelsea, London, aged 68.

Ancestry

References

1649 births
1718 deaths
Members of the pre-1707 English Parliament for constituencies in Cornwall
Members of the Parliament of Great Britain for constituencies in Cornwall
British MPs 1707–1708
British MPs 1708–1710
British MPs 1710–1713
British MPs 1713–1715
British MPs 1715–1722
Younger sons of earls
Members of the Privy Council of Ireland
Fellows of the Royal Society
Alumni of Christ's College, Cambridge
People from Lanhydrock
English MPs 1661–1679
English MPs 1679
English MPs 1680–1681
English MPs 1685–1687
English MPs 1689–1690
English MPs 1690–1695
English MPs 1695–1698
English MPs 1698–1700
English MPs 1701
English MPs 1701–1702
English MPs 1702–1705
English MPs 1705–1707